West Loch Tarbert, Argyll is a long and narrow sea loch on the western side of the Kintyre peninsula in Scotland.

Geography
The head of the loch lies near the village of Tarbert and it reaches the open sea at Ardpatrick Point some  distant.

The island of Eilean Ceann na Creige, off the south shore, is connected to the mainland by a causeway. It is the ferry terminal for Islay.

History
Around the year 1093, Magnus Barefoot, King of Norway had his longship dragged across the isthmus at Tarbert between West Loch Tarbert and East Loch Tarbert as part of a campaign to increase his possessions in the Hebrides. He made an arrangement with King Malcolm III of Scotland that he could take possession of land on the west coast around which a ship could sail. Magnus declared that Kintyre had "better land than the best of the Hebrides", and by taking command of his ship's tiller and "sailing" across the isthmus he was able to claim the entire  peninsula, which remained under Norse rule for more than a dozen years as a result.

Ferry services
In the 1960s, Western Ferries began operating a car ferry, with a simple stern-loading ramp, from Kennacraig on the south shore. This served Port Askaig on Islay, in competition with the mail steamer, operated by MacBraynes from West Tarbert near the head of the loch. The new service soon won a significant share of the traffic and stimulated MacBraynes to modernise the Islay route. In January 1970, hoist-loading MV Arran was transferred from the Clyde. She gave two daily return sailings, one each to Port Ellen and Port Askaig, as well as sailings to Craighouse on Jura, Gigha and Colonsay. Over the winter 1972/73, Arran's hoist and side-ramps were removed, along with the superstructure aft of them. She was converted to a stern-loading vessel, with a stern ramp and an open car deck.  In this guise, she took on a new timetable – three double crossings a day between modified terminals at Port Ellen and West Loch Tarbert. Port Askaig was left to Western Ferries.

Over the next five years Pioneer became well established, running to Port Ellen and Gigha. In 1978, Caledonian MacBrayne took over the Western Ferries terminal at Kennacraig, with the deeper-draught MV Iona, again providing a service to both Port Ellen and Port Askaig, as well as calling at Gigha. In 1989, the more spacious,  became the Islay ship, with the drive-through  taking over in 1993.  became the main Islay vessel in 2001, with  replacing Isle of Arran in 2011 and relegating Hebridean Isles to the second Islay vessel.

Footnotes

Sea lochs of Scotland
Lochs of Argyll and Bute